Soviet Submarine A-3  (AG-25, Marxist) was a Soviet Submarine from the 1922 constructed A (AG) Class and served during World War II.

Construction 
AG-25 was ordered on 14 September 1916 by the Soviet Navy. She was constructed in 1922 as part of the A (AG) Class along with her four sister submarines at the Associated Factories And Shipyards Of Nikolayev shipyard. AG stands for Amerikansky Golland (American, Holland design). She was launched on 5 April 1922 and was completed on 24 May 1922. The engine was rated at 960 nhp when surfaced. She was also renamed a number of times to AG-25 im. tov. Trotskogo, PL-18 and Marxist before she gained name A-3.

War career 
A-3 became part of the Black Sea fleet of the Soviet Navy at the start of the Second World War. In total she made 19 war patrols during the conflict with some notable events. On 2 May 1942 the A-3 fired a few torpedoes at the German merchant ships Arkadia and Salzburg when she was near Odessa, yet no torpedoes hit their targets. On 29 May 1942 the A-3 successfully sank the Romanian merchant ship Sulina when she was off Odessa. On 11 May 1943 the A-3 fired two torpedoes at the German barges Mal 1, Mal 2, and Mal 3 when they were off Yalta, but failed to hit any of them. The following day while the submarine was near Crimea she mistakenly fired two torpedoes at the wreck of the Soviet transport ship Fabritsius which had been sunk by a German bomber on 2 March 1942.

Sinking 
The wrecks current condition is unknown. Russian sources states, that position of attack is too far both from designated position of A-3 and from actual position of A-3, which could be en route to base. Thus a reason of loss is still disputed.

References

Submarines of the Soviet Navy
World War II submarines of the Soviet Union
1922 ships
Ships lost with all hands
World War II shipwrecks in the Black Sea
Submarines sunk by German warships